"God Is On the Move" is a song by Christian rock band 7eventh Time Down from their third album, God Is on the Move. It was released in 2015 as the album's lead single. One lyric video and one music video were created for the song.

Charts

Certifications

References

External links

2013 songs
7eventh Time Down songs
Songs written by Ian Eskelin
Songs written by Tony Wood (musician)